Sulemani Keeda is an independent slacker comedy film directed by Amit V Masurkar and produced by Tulsea Pictures in association with Mantra/Runaway Entertainment. It was first screened at the Mumbai Film Festival in 2013. The film is distributed by PVR Director's Rare and was released in Mumbai, NCR-Delhi, Bangalore, Pune, Ahmedabad and Kolkata on 5 December 2014. TVF is the online partner for the movie.

Plot 
In this slacker bro-mantic comedy, writing partners Dulal and Mainak dream of shaking up the Bollywood film industry in India with their script Sulemani Keeda (Hindi street slang for "Pain in the Ass"). When they're being rejected by producers who refuse to read their script, they lurk around bookstores and poetry slams shamelessly hitting on girls. They find some hope when the drug addled, cat-obsessed Gonzo Kapoor, the son of a famous B movie producer, hires them to write an art house film billed as "Tarkovsky with orgies" for his directorial debut. All seems well until Dulal meets Ruma, a beautiful photographer who makes him question his choice to sell out.

Cast 
 Naveen Kasturia as Dulal
 Mayank Tewari as Mainak
 Aditi Vasudev as Ruma
 Karan Mirchandani as Gonzo
 Krishna Singh Bisht as Pokhriyal
 Rukshana Tabassum as Oona from Poona
 Dilip Prabhavalkar as Nene
 Razak Khan as Sweety Kapoor
 Rohini Ramanathan as Rohini
 Mahesh Bhatt as himself
 Amrita Rao as herself
 Anil Sharma as himself

Soundtrack

Music is composed, arranged and produced by Arfaaz  & Anurag.

Critical reception 
The film has overall positive reviews.
Farhan Akhtar mentions "Contemporary filmmaking at its best! Watch it!”
The co-writer of Pulp Fiction, Roger Avary watched the film in Los Angeles and emailed, "[Sulemani Keeda] reminds me of my early years with Quentin Tarantino! A free-wheeling, manic comedy about how the folly of ambition can alter a friendship."

Deborah Young reviewing the film in The Hollywood Reporter writes, "The film's brash, open-hearted spirit is full of giggly jokes that get the audience on the boys' side. There's much to appreciate in the inventive mise-en-scene and creative editing."

Firstpost.com puts Sulemani Keeda in 2014's "Most Awaited Films" list alongside biggies like Anurag Kashyap's Bombay Velvet and Vishal Bharadwaj's Haider.

Sulemani Keeda has been featured in India Todays list of films to watch out for in 2014.

In an article featuring the film in The Indian Express, journalist Sankhayan Ghosh writes, "Sulemani Keeda is a universal story. It takes the narrative path of a slacker comedy, a popular film genre. It is light-hearted and funny with the director's assured touches, for instance, an animated set-piece that shows a pet cat snort cocaine and kill itself in a fish bowl."

In the words of critic Elvis D'Silva: "You have to be as exhausted by Bollywood romance as I am to appreciate exactly how surprising and wonderful that is… For me, the real star of the movie was the blossoming romantic relationship between Dulal and Ruma. Kudos to Mr. Masurkar for pulling off a depiction of youthful attraction without ever being loud or boisterous."

Critic Arnesh Ghose writes, "While Tewari steals the show with his frolicking comic timing and dialogue delivery, Masurkar should be applauded for a crisp screenplay and dialogues… the all-pervading irreverence and we-don’t-give-a-fuck attitude makes it an intimate story of Mumbai's film-dreaming strugglers."

Reviewer Somen Mishra writes, "Honest, charming and funny… the romantic track is neatly done... Liquor in plastic glass, flat owner's son asking for rent, no money for screenwriters, another Kapoor struggling for break – it gets some of the small details so bang on."

Birmingham based South Asian culture website Desiblitz.com called the film "youthful and hilarious" and sponsored the Q&A after the screenings in London, the recordings of which are available online.

Mayank Shekhar writes about Sulemani Keeda "Slacker Comedy at its Best- An outsider's take, like Sulemani Keeda, requires only putting a camera before two strugglers and everything just becomes so naturally funny!"

Ahead of its 5 December theatrical release, the film was screened for Press Preview at PVR in Juhu, a western Mumbai suburb. Several celebrities, actors, writers and other associates turned up for the event packing a full house. Press preview burgeoned into 'Premier' with the crowd enthusiastically turning up and making it huge. Amrita Rao, Ranvir Shorey, Kanu Behl (of Titli fame) and Vikramaditya Motwane had all the praises for young writers slack comedy.

Arindam Sen on Indiannerve.com calls it a "Profanity-Laced Indie Gem: The ending was Roman Holiday-esque hence grounded which I felt was very well done. I cannot wait for what Amit Masurkar does next."

In her review, Komal Shastri-Khedkar for Desiblitz mentions "This is the kind of film which Indian audiences are hungry for; realistic, fresh and characters so genuine. The film is urban, fresh, light hearted and definitely a wonderful weekend watch!"

Arnab Banerjee of Firstpost rightly puts across "The film echoes sentiments and experiences of all screenplay writers worldwide, whether in Bollywood or Hollywood. That must be the reason for the young film’s instant connect with moviegoers in the festival circuit wherever it has been screened so far. This is their story, just padded with some caricature and prettiness."

Hindustan Times critic Rohit Vats justifies Sulemani Keeda in the title as "Ordinary people, Extraordinary show"

Rediff.com says "The duo's (Naveen and Mayank) prowess as actors becomes obvious in a brilliant scene that depicts one of their writing sessions in black and white, without any words.Every other actor in the film has clearly given it their 100% too – from Krishna Singh Bisht's manchild Pokhriyal, Karan Mirchandani's cocaine-snorting, cat-loving Gonzo and the lovely Aditi Vasudev as Ruma."

Rachit Gupta for Filmfare.com says "A special mention to the CGI scene where Karan’s character snorts cocaine. This particular scene belongs in such memorable movies like Pineapple Express and This Is The End. This is beyond hilarious. It will give you a stomach ache. A thousand likes to Masurkar for deviating from the norm and having the audacity to try something different."

"The film is peppered with cinematic references, deftly treated with equal parts devout worship and irreverent satire. It follows an episodic structure much like their script in the film that never sees the light of the day, but whatever it lacks in action it makes up for in wordplay. Though some might say that Sulemani Keeda can be best described in one of its own closing  lines, (“Dialogues acche thhe, film theek thi,”) I'll say it's definitely worth a watch for some zany comedy, break-out performances and a peppy soundtrack that you'll surprisingly find yourself humming on the way back home."Dipika Bhatia summarises for Business Standard.

Shubha Shetty Saha analyses about the casting and editing as following on Mid-day "Casting is good, editing (Khushboo Agarwal) is fantastic. Naveen and Mayank fit into their roles pretty well and do a commendable job. A special mention has to be made of Aditi who carried her role with remarkable ease and she is pretty easy on the eye, too. Hope this girl gets more roles to prove her mettle further."

Missmalini.com mentions "Sulemani Keeda is the kind of film you’d like to make – a film with way too many inside jokes that are broad enough to welcome an audience into and assuring them that they’re going to have a great time! If you’re watching one movie this week, do yourself a favour and watch this one."

DearCinema.com reviews "Sulemani Keeda is quite a few things at once- a snapshot of strugglers in Bollywood , a bittersweet coming-of-age saga, a tale of friendship between two very dissimilar men, and a love story that may not have a conventional ending. It also shows a side of Mumbai not captured often on screen, the city of struggling, wannabe yet smug screenwriters and directors"

Sonal Chopra for Sify.com writes "Director Amit V Masurkar's indie slacker comedy hits home for the most part as it is gives us these deeply flawed, real characters that we laugh at and laugh with. We emotionally invest in their everyday tragedies and smile at their comical solutions. In that sense, the film is as rich, complex and tragicomic as life itself. Go for it!"

Shekhar Kapur, Mallika Sherawat, Nagesh Kukunoor, Vinay Pathak, Ayushmann Khurrana attend special screening of Sulemani Keeda at PVR Juhu on 10 December 2014 and celebrated Aditi Vasudev's birthday along too.

Filmcurry.com bottom lines as "We all need and want movies like this one to be made and entertain us completely. Wonder why we see such A-list comedies so rare. This one is a must and great watch, it is brilliantly and effectively made, keeps one hooked throughout and absolutely entertains."

Rajeev Masand, one of India's most well known critic says " Slickly shot, capturing a real, lived-in feel of the city, this is a charming little indie that manages to say something important, while never forgetting to make you laugh. I'm going with three out of five for Sulemani Keeda. Give it a chance."

Subhash K. Jha mentions "In a world infested by imposters of movie-making here's a toast to the dost that is refreshing,charming, cocky and tongue in cheek. SulemaniKeeda follows with fecund ferocity the some-times farcical, some-times quirky odyssey of a couple of oddball writers in that place of perverse entertainment known, for eccentric reasons as Bollywood."

Before releasing in India, Sulemani Keeda (Writers) promoted it in the indie-film circuit. It was screened at the Mumbai Film Festival, New York Indian Film Festival, Indian Film Festival of Los Angeles, London Indian Film Festival, MISAFF Mississauga, Zurich Film Festival, Oaxaca Film Festival in Mexico. At London Indian Film Festival, Amit said "A film like this can only be set in a city like Bombay, where there is a very strong hub of movies."

Recently screenings happened in Seattle, Frankfurt, Cologne and Birmingham.

References

External links
 IMDb Page
 Official Trailer

2013 films
Indian avant-garde and experimental films
Films about Bollywood
Indian comedy films
2010s avant-garde and experimental films
2013 comedy films
2010s Hindi-language films
Hindi-language comedy films